The Seversky SEV-3 was an American three-seat amphibian monoplane, the first aircraft designed and built by the Seversky Aircraft Corporation.

Design and development
The SEV-3 was an all-metal cantilever low-wing monoplane powered by a nose-mounted 420 hp (313 kW) Wright J-6 Whirlwind radial engine. It had two cockpits in tandem, a forward cockpit for the pilot and a rear cockpit for two passengers, both with sliding canopies. It could either be fitted with twin amphibious floats which had main wheels fitted in the floats to allow it to operate from land, or with a fixed tailwheel undercarriage with the mainwheels enclosed in large fairings.

The SEV-3 first flew as a floatplane in June 1933, demonstrating excellent performance as both an amphibian and a landplane. It was built in small numbers mainly for export.

Operational history
An SEV-3 established a world speed record for piston-engined amphibians in 1933, and on 15 September 1935, a Wright Cyclone-powered SEV-3 set a record of 230 mph (370.8 km/h) which stood for 49 years. A landplane version was also developed with conventional landing gear.

The design influenced a long line of Seversky and later Republic aircraft, eventually leading to the development of the P-47 Thunderbolt. A landplane version was used by the United States Army Air Corps as a basic trainer with the designation BT-8, 30 of which were ordered in 1935. This proved grossly underpowered and was quickly replaced by the North American BT-9.

One BT-8 was delivered to Bolling Field, on 11 June 1936, for use by Chief of the Air Corps Major General Oscar Westover, and assigned to the 14th Bombardment Squadron, GHQ Air Force. It replaced an O-38F, which was reassigned to the 21st Observation Squadron, GHQ Air Force, for general flying.

Operators

Spanish Republican Air Force

Colombian Air Force

Variants
SEV-3XAR

Landplane trainer
SEV-3XLR
Landplane
SEV-3M-WW
Amphibian for the Colombian Air Force, six built (only delivered four to Colombia), with Wright Whirlwind engines.
BT-8
Landplane basic-trainer for the United States Army Air Corps, developed from SEV-3XAR. 30 built.
SEV-X-BT multi-discipline trainer version of the BT-8 with retractable undercarriage. The sole SEV-X-BT lost in competition to the North American BT-9 and was reportedly scrapped for spares to service the Seversky 2PA.

Specifications (BT-8)

See also

References

Further reading
 Green, William and Gordon Swanborough. "The End of the Beginning...The Seversky P-35". Air Enthusiast, No. 10, July–September 1979, pp. 8–21. 
 Howson, Gerald. "A Seversky in the Spanish War". Air Enthusiast, No. 18, April–July 1982, pp. 32–36. 
 The Illustrated Encyclopedia of Aircraft (Part Work 1982–1985) London: Orbis Publishing, 1985.
 Swanborough, F. G. and Peter M. Bowers. United States Military Aircraft since 1909. London: Putnam, 1963.
 Taylor, Michael J.H. Jane's Encyclopedia of Aviation. London: Studio Editions, 1989. .
 "Fast American Amphibians",  Flight, 16 November 1933

1930s United States civil utility aircraft
Floatplanes
SEV-3
Single-engined tractor aircraft
Low-wing aircraft
Amphibious aircraft
Aircraft first flown in 1933